Dracula's Guest and Other Weird Stories is a collection of short stories by Bram Stoker, first published in 1914, two years after Stoker's death, at the behest of his widow Florence Balcombe.

The same collection has been issued under short titles including simply Dracula's Guest. Meanwhile, collections published under longer titles contain different selections of stories.

Contents of the collection

Adaptations  
 "The Burial of the Rats" was adapted in 1995 as a movie called Bram Stoker's Burial of the Rats by Roger Corman's film company and as a comic book by Jerry Prosser and Francisco Solano Lopez.
 "The Squaw" was adapted for comics by Archie Goodwin (script) and Reed Crandall (art) for Creepy magazine no.13.
 Dracula's Guest was adapted for comics  by E. Nelson Bridwell  (script) and Frank Bolle (art) for Eerie magazine no.16.

Notes

References 
 Klinger, Leslie S. (2008) The New Annotated Dracula. W.W. Norton & Co.. .
 Skal, David J. (1993). The Monster Show: A Cultural History of Horror. Penguin Books. .

External links 

 Bram Stoker Online – Full text and PDF versions of the entire collection.
 

1914 short story collections
Books published posthumously
Dracula in written fiction
Horror short story collections
Routledge books
Short story collections by Bram Stoker
Vampires in written fiction